Joseph Lavergne (October 29, 1847 – January 9, 1922) was a lawyer, judge, editor and political figure in Quebec. He represented Drummond—Arthabaska in the House of Commons of Canada from 1887 to 1897 as a Liberal member.

He was born in Saint-Pierre-de-la-Rivière-du-Sud, Montmagny County, Canada East, the son of David Lavergne and Marie-Geneviève Delagrave, was educated at Sainte-Anne-de-la-Pocatière and studied law with his uncle Joseph Delagrave. He was called to the Quebec bar in 1869, set up practice in Princeville and then Arthabaska, where he practised law in partnership with Wilfrid Laurier. In 1876, Lavergne married Émilie Barthe, the daughter of Joseph-Guillaume Barthe. He served as mayor for Arthabaskaville and warden for Arthabaska County. Lavergne was editor for L'Union des Cantons de l'Est. He was also bâtonnier for the Arthabaska section of the Quebec Bar.

Lavergne resigned his seat in 1897 after he was named puisne judge for the Quebec Superior Court for Ottawa district. His brother Louis succeeded him as representative for Drummond—Arthabaska in the House of Commons. In 1901, he was transferred to Montreal district. Lavergne was named to the Court of King's Bench in 1906. He died in Montreal at the age of 74.

His son Armand Renaud also served as a member of the House of Commons.

Electoral record

References 

The Canadian parliamentary companion, 1897 AJ Gemmill

1847 births
1922 deaths
Members of the House of Commons of Canada from Quebec
Liberal Party of Canada MPs
Mayors of places in Quebec
Judges in Quebec